The 1990–91 Saint Francis Red Flash men's basketball team represented Saint Francis University during the 1990–91 NCAA Division I men's basketball season. The Red Flash, led by fourth-year head coach Jim Baron, played their home games at the DeGol Arena and were members of the Northeast Conference. They finished the season 24–8, 13–3 in NEC play to finish in a tie for first place. They won the Northeast Conference tournament, their first, to advance to a play-in game against Fordham, which they also won, to secure a bid to the NCAA tournament. The Red Flash fell in the opening round to Lute Olson's Arizona Wildcats. As of 2022, this is their only NCAA tournament appearance.

Roster

Schedule

|-
!colspan=9 style=| Regular season

|-
!colspan=9 style=| NEC Tournament

|-
!colspan=9 style=| NCAA Tournament

Awards and honors
Mike Iuzzolino – NEC Player of the Year

Team players in the 1991 NBA draft

References

Saint Francis Red Flash men's basketball seasons
Saint Francis (PA)
Saint Francis (PA)
1990 in sports in Pennsylvania
1991 in sports in Pennsylvania